This is a list of senators from the state of Queensland since Australian Federation in 1901.

List

Senators, Queensland